State Route 47 (SR 47) is a  state highway in the southern part of the U.S. state of Alabama. The southern terminus of the highway is at its intersection with U.S. Route 84 (US 84) at Mexia in Monroe County, and the northern terminus of the highway is at its intersection with SR 10 at Awin in Wilcox County.

Although the route is signed "north–south", the initial trajectory of SR 47 is eastward at its southern terminus.

Route description
SR 47 begins at an intersection with US 84 in Mexia. It heads towards Monroeville. At Monroeville, the highway turns northward as it begins a  concurrency with SR 21 heading towards Beatrice.

At Beatrice, SR 21 and SR 47 intersect SR 265 and turn eastward as they head towards Riley, where SR 21 turns northward and SR 47 continues eastward towards Midway. At Midway, the highway intersects SR 83 and turns northeastward as it leads to its northern terminus at SR 10 in Awin.

Major intersections

See also

References

047
Transportation in Monroe County, Alabama
Transportation in Wilcox County, Alabama